Bo Yikao was the eldest son of King Wen of Zhou and the elder brother of King Wu who was the founder of the Zhou dynasty of ancient China.

As a member of the Zhou royal house, his family name was Ji (姬). "Bo" refers to his status as the oldest son of his father. "Yikao"  may have been his personal name or a posthumous name used for ritual purposes.

It is known that he did not inherit his father's realm along the Wei River. Based on later Chinese inheritance laws and legends, it is typically thought that he predeceased his father, e.g. by Sima Qian. Stories such as the Fengshen Yanyi lay the guilt upon King Zhou, the last king of the Shang dynasty, and the traditional account of his death was taken by later Chinese jurists as the first instance of lingchi (the "death by a thousand cuts"). However, passages in the Book of Rites and the Masters of Huainan assume that King Wu's inheritance simply represented an aberration or even an older tradition among the Zhou of passing over the eldest son. (In traditional accounts, Bo Yikao's granduncle Taibo of Wu had likewise been passed over in favor of a younger son.)

In fiction 
In the Fengshen Yanyi, Bo Yikao is the oldest and most outstanding son of Ji Chang, the "Duke of the West" of the Shang dynasty. He is well versed in music and the arts, handsome, and filial. The book recounts the story of Chang's imprisonment at Youli and (ahistorically) credits Yikao with bringing the bribes to free him. At his audience, King Zhou's concubine Daji finds Yikao attractive and has the king employ him to teach her how to play the zither. During a lesson, Daji attempts to seduce the boy but he rejects and ridicules her. Daji's infatuation turns to hatred: she complains to the king that Yikao molested her and insulted the king in his music. King Zhou is furious and he orders Yikao to be executed, minced into pieces, and made into meat cakes. The king then sends the cakes to Ji Chang. Ji Chang's mastery of divination means he has already foreseen his son's fate but, in order not to arouse the king's suspicion, he hides his sorrow and gleefully consumes the cakes. Thinking his divination incompetent, the king then allows the duke to leave.  On the way home, the grieving Ji Chang vomits out the meat, which transforms into three white rabbits that are later brought under the care of the moon goddess Chang'e.

The horrible death of Bo Yikao has solidified the will of the Zhou people to rebel and overthrow the tyrannical King Zhou.  Four years after the death of Ji Chang, Bo Yikao's younger brother Ji Fa rises up and defeated King Zhou at the Battle of Muye and establishing the Zhou dynasty.  Bo Yikao's soul is assigned by Jiang Ziya as the Zi Wei Emperor, who rules over the North Pole.

Ancestry

References 

Investiture of the Gods characters